Almamy Touré (born 28 April 1996) is a Malian professional footballer who plays as a right back for Bundesliga club Eintracht Frankfurt.

Club career

Monaco
Touré is a youth exponent from AS Monaco.  He made his league debut on 20 February 2015 in a 1–0 away win against OGC Nice  replacing Layvin Kurzawa after 35 minutes. Bernardo Silva scored the only goal of the game. He started his first game on 25 February 2015, during Monaco's surprise 3–1 victory against Arsenal at the Emirates Stadium. Touré signed a new four-year contract with Monaco on 19 May 2015.

Eintracht Frankfurt
On 31 January 2019, Touré joined Eintracht Frankfurt on a four-and-a-half year deal.

International career
Though Touré did not possess a French passport until 2018, he received one to represent the France under-21 national team instead of Mali.
Touré switched his international allegiance back to Mali in 2022, when he was called up for their 2022 FIFA World Cup qualifying matches against Tunisia.

Career statistics

Club

Honours

Club
Monaco
Ligue 1: 2016–17

Eintracht Frankfurt
UEFA Europa League: 2021–22

References

External links

 
 
 

1996 births
Living people
Sportspeople from Bamako
French footballers
France under-21 international footballers
France youth international footballers
French expatriate footballers
Malian footballers
French people of Malian descent
Malian emigrants to France
Malian expatriate footballers
Expatriate footballers in Monaco
Expatriate footballers in Germany
Association football defenders
Ligue 1 players
AS Monaco FC players
Eintracht Frankfurt players
Bundesliga players
UEFA Europa League winning players